Shishir Parkhie is a widely acclaimed Indian Ghazal Singer having a unique distinction of being nominated twice for the prestigious Global Indian Music Academy Awards in the Best Ghazal Album category. He has regaled and enthralled audiences across the country and abroad through his remarkable Ghazal performances. Shishir is an adept Composer and a Playback Singer also known for his performances in Bhajan, Geet, Devotional & Filmi Songs.

Early life

Born in a family with a strong musical background, Shishir received his training in music at a young age from his mother, Pratima Parkhie. His father Shri Sharad Raghunath Parkhie was working as the Deputy Chief Architect for the city of Bokaro. Pratima sang Sugam Sangeet regularly for All India Radio, Ranchi. Shishir started to sing when he was only six years old. He also learned Tabla under Shri Kedarnath Thakur for three years. Soon thereafter he began giving performances on stage and catching attention. His outstanding participation in various competitions won many accolades and his first solo concert at the age of fifteen in Bokaro Steel City drew a lot of positive feedback from the Ghazal community. He received an award from All India Radio on the occasion of International Year of the Child in 1979 where he also performed at the National concert. Shishir completed his ICSE from St. Xavier's School, Bokaro & later moved to Nagpur for higher studies.

Shishir completed his HSSC with General Science from Hislop College, Nagpur. He then joined Manoharbhai Patel Institute of Engineering and Technology (MIET), Gondia to pursue a Bachelor's Degree in Electronics Engineering but after his second year he got transferred to Yeshwantrao Chavan College of Engineering, Nagpur when he started performing along with various music groups and also pursued his solo Ghazal career. He composed several commercial jingles. His big break came composing and singing for Doordarshan which then led to several musical albums. He is also trained in Hindustani Vocal Classical Music under the guidance of Dr. Narayanrao Mangrulkar & Smt. Rekha Saney of Nagpur. He completed his degree of Sangeet Visharad from Akhil Bharatiya Gandharva Mahavidyalaya.

Ghazal albums

1. Ahteraam - Tribute to the legendary poets on T-Series (2008)

2. Once More Ghazals on T-Series (2009)

3. Roomaniyat - Ghazals of love & longing on Mystica Music (2011)

4. Khulus - Ghazals of dreams, desires & destiny on T-Series (Oct 2012)

5. Aatish Tha Aftaab Tha- A Jagjit Singh tribute ghazal single (Oct 2012)

6. Siyahat - A journey through emotions on Saregama (June 2013)

7. Aashnaai on Times Music (November 2014)

8. Qurbat on Times Music (November 2016)

9. Virasat - The Legacy of Legends on Times Music (February 2020)

10. Ghazal Apni Sunata Hoon on Red Ribbon Entertainment (September 2020)

11. Kya Khona Kya Paana on Hungama Digital Media Entertainment (January 2022)

Devotional and Spiritual albums

 Mahima Sadgurunath Ki T-Series
 Bolo Jai Siya Ram T-Series
 Shree Mahalaxmi Jagadamba koradi (Amritvaani) T-Series
 Tere Naam Anek Tu Ek He Hai T-Series
 Avtaar Meher Baba Ki Amar Katha T-Series
 Shree Sai Smaran Stuti Paath T-Series
 Raah Sai Ne Sachchi Dikhayee Hai T-Series
 Hum Bharat Ki Shaan Hai T-Series
 Buddha Vandana Karu (Marathi) T-Series
 Sheel Sugandha (Marathi) T-Series
 Pratibimba Krantisuriyache(Marathi) T-Series
 Shree Gajanan Maharaj Amritvaani Venus Records & Tapes
 Annayog- Bhojan Mantras Times Music
 Geet Geeta Mp3 Complete Bhagvad Gita in Hindi Times Music
 Devi Mata, Bihaan Music
 Aao Chalein KoradiVCD Sampoorna Koradi Devi Yatra Darshan T-Series
 Prabhu Ke mangal Gun Gaao VCD R -Series
 Ab Meri Awaaz Suno R- Series
 Utha Gadya Arunodaya Zala R- Series (Marathi)
 Mera Chakradhar- Krishna Music
 Dhammakranti (Marathi)
 Satguru Mahima by Manav Dharm
 Shri Hans Chalisa by Manav Dharm
 Darakade Valali Tujhya Gautamachi Paule (Marathi) T-Series

References

External links
 
 

Living people
Indian male ghazal singers
Indian male composers
Musicians from Nagpur
1967 births
Bhajan singers